The five-striped sparrow (Amphispizopsis quinquestriata) is a medium-sized sparrow. It is the only member of the genus Amphispizopsis. It was formerly classified in the genus Amphispiza with the black-throated sparrow (Amphispiza bilineata).

This passerine bird is primarily found along the eastern Gulf of California region and Pacific region of mainland western Mexico, with a breeding range that extends into the southern tip of the U.S. state of Arizona, the Sierra Madre Occidental mountain range containing the Madrean sky islands, of southeastern Arizona, extreme southwestern New Mexico, and northern Sonora. The species was first recorded breeding in the US in 1950s and remains a rare breeding bird.

This species is a regular victim of cowbird nest parasites.

Habitat 
The five-stripped sparrow favours steep brushy hillsides in canyon regions.

Feeding 
This species often forages on the ground, looking for small seeds and insects. In the summer, the species diet shifts more towards insects such as caterpillars.

References

Native birds of the Southwestern United States
Birds of Mexico
Birds of the Sierra Madre Occidental
five-striped sparrow
five-striped sparrow
five-striped sparrow
Passerellidae
American sparrows
Taxobox binomials not recognized by IUCN